Matthew DeCourcey (born April 4, 1983) is a Canadian Liberal politician, who represented the riding of Fredericton in the House of Commons of Canada from 2015 until 2019.

Family and education

Matthew Carey DeCourcey is the son of Harold DeCourcey a retired probation officer for the Province of New Brunswick and Dawn DeCourcey, a retired teacher in Fredericton, New Brunswick. 
 
DeCourcey graduated from Fredericton High School in 2001. DeCourcey graduated from St. Thomas University in 2005. DeCourcey graduated from Mount St. Vincent University in 2007 with a Master's degree in public relations (MPR).

In 2019, he announced his engagement to Liberal member of Parliament Maryam Monsef.

Career

DeCourcey first became involved in politics during his studies at St. Thomas University, volunteering for Paul Martin's successful federal Liberal leadership bid in 2003. He worked for Fredericton MP Andy Scott from 2005 to 2006, and subsequently worked for Labrador MP Todd Russell. He was a director on the board of the Fredericton YMCA and taught Child and Youth Rights at Saint Thomas University.

He spent five months in The Gambia on an international development initiative, and on his return to Canada he became the director of communications for New Brunswick's Child and Youth Advocate.

Politics
DeCourcey became the Liberal Party's candidate in Fredericton during the 2015 federal election, and won, ousting Conservative incumbent and former cabinet minister Keith Ashfield.

DeCourcey was appointed to the House of Commons Special Committee on Electoral Reform, which was established due to the campaign promise made by the Liberal Party that 2015 would be the last Federal election decided under the first-past-the-post system. That committee travelled across Canada in 2016 to consult with Canadians as to their preference for electoral reform, and in doing so, heard widespread support for a switch from the first-past-the-post electoral system to proportional representation. The Liberal government ultimately refused to table any legislation to enact electoral reform.

In spring 2018 DeCourcey was criticized for violating House of Commons rules by using his taxpayer-funded M.P. newsletter to recruit volunteers for the Liberal Party.

He was defeated in the 2019 federal election by Jenica Atwin of the Green Party.

Electoral record

References

External links

 Official Website

1983 births
Liberal Party of Canada MPs
Living people
Members of the House of Commons of Canada from New Brunswick
Mount Saint Vincent University alumni
Politicians from Fredericton
St. Thomas University (New Brunswick) alumni
21st-century Canadian politicians